St Mary MacKillop College, formerly known as MacKillop Catholic College, is a Catholic high school in the Australian capital of Canberra, with two campuses in the Tuggeranong Valley. The school is the result of an amalgamation of Padua High School and St. Peter's College in 1997. Mackillop College accepts students from year 7 to 12. There are two campuses of St Mary MacKillop Catholic College, the junior campus (years 7 to 9) in Wanniassa and the senior campus (years 10 to 12) in Isabella Plains.

Administration
The College is divided into four houses for administration, pastoral care and extra curricular purposes. These houses - Mindygari, Meup Meup, Gurabang and Ngadyung - represent the four classical elements, with names derived from the language the Ngunnawal people, the local Aboriginal people.

The uniform of St Mary MacKillop College is primarily in the school colours navy, teal and white. Students wear a summer uniform in the first and fourth terms of the school year, and a winter uniform in the second and third terms. Students in years 11 and 12 wear a separate senior uniform. This senior uniform for girls is the same as the junior girls winter uniform, but with a green line on the collar. Senior girls only have one uniform and do not alternate in summer/winter. The senior boys uniform is the same as the junior boys uniform, except the shirts are blue instead of white, and there is a different tie.

Executive
Sister Noeline Quinnane, a member of the religious order founded by the college's patron Mary MacKillop, was the founding Principal of St Mary MacKillop College, serving from 1997 to 2003. Moira Najdecki served as Principal at MacKillop from 2004 until 2006. Moria Najdecki left at the end of 2006 to take up the role of Director of the Catholic Education Office. Rita Daniels moved across from St Clare's College to take up the role of Acting Principal in 2007, returning to be Principal at St Clare's College in 2008. Michael Lee succeeded Rita Daniels as principal beginning in January 2008, having previously held positions at Hennessy Catholic College and Mt Carmel School, Yass.

Paul O'Callagan has been Campus Head at Wanniassa from 2005 till 2008. Louis White took on campus head in 2009; Sandra Darley has been Campus Head at Isabella from 2008. Each campus also has an Assistant Principal Pastoral Care and an Assistant Principal Curriculum; there is a cross-campus Bursar, and the school also has other executive positions intermittently.

Notable alumni
 Genesis Owusu - Ghanaian-Australian rapper
 Melissa Breen - Australian representative to the 2012 Olympics in Athletics
 Kimberley Starr - the Australian novelist, attended Padua High School from 1982-1985.
 Katrina Lewis, bronze medalist at the 2008 Summer Paralympics and finalist at the 2006 Commonwealth Games, graduated in 2006.
 Carl Valeri - Socceroos midfielder
 Zed Seselja - Former Liberal opposition leader in The Legislative Assembly of The Australian Capital Territory & Federal Senator for the Australian Capital Territory.
 Luke Pilkington - Australian soccer player
 Ivan Zelic - Australian soccer player & Actor
 Nick Cotric - Australian rugby league player
 Sebastian Kris - Australian rugby league player

See also
 List of schools in the Australian Capital Territory

References

External links
 St Mary MacKillop College Website

Catholic secondary schools in the Australian Capital Territory
Educational institutions established in 1997
1997 establishments in Australia